Danila Yakovlevich Antsiferov (died in 1712) was a Russian explorer.

Upon the death of Vladimir Atlasov in 1711, Danila Antsiferov was elected Cossack ataman of the Kamchatka. Together with Ivan Kozyrevsky, he was one of the first Russian Cossacks to visit the Shumshu and Paramushir Islands of the Kuril Islands. Danila Antsiferov and his companions were the first ones to describe these islands in writing. He was killed by the Itelmens in 1712.

Legacy
One of the Kuril Islands bear Antsiferov's name, along with a cape and a volcano on the Paramushir Island.

External links
 Map of Antsiferov Island from Wikimapia.org

17th-century births
1712 deaths
Explorers from the Russian Empire
Explorers of Asia
Cossacks from the Russian Empire
People from Tomsk
History of the Kamchatka Peninsula
18th-century explorers
18th-century people from the Russian Empire